Joyful Rebellion is the second album of alternative hip hop artist k-os. It was released 13 August 2004 in Canada by EMI and 21 September 2004 in the United States by Virgin Records. It debuted at number 7 on the Canadian Albums Chart, and went platinum in Canada, selling over 100,000 units.

Awards
The MuchMusic Video Awards (MMVA's)
2005 Best Pop Video ("Crabbuckit")
2005 MuchVibe Best Rap Video ("Man I Used To Be")
Juno Awards
2005 Single of the Year ("Crabbuckit")
2005 Rap Recording of the Year ("Joyful Rebellion")
2005 Video of the Year ("B-Boy Stance")
Canadian Urban Music Awards
2004 Hip Hop Recording of the Year ("B-Boy Stance")
2004 Music Video of the Year ("B-Boy Stance")

At the 2017 Polaris Music Prize, the album won the jury vote for the Heritage Prize in the 1996-2005 category.

Lyrics
Like Exit, Joyful Rebellion primarily focuses on k-os's negative views of the music industry, supplemented by more metaphorical lyrics.

The track "Man I Used to Be" is about a man who wants to revert to his previous self. The tracks "The Love Song" and "The Mirror" are semi-autobiographical. The song "One Blood" is an anti-war message. The song "Papercutz" is k-os's denial that Exit was his last album. "Commandante" features the opening sample of a woman speaking in Spanish on a voice mail.

Track listing
 "EMCEE Murdah" – 3:30
 "Crucial" – 3:25
 "Man I Used to Be" – 5:04
 "Crabbuckit" – 3:48
 "B-Boy Stance" – 4:00
 "Commandante" – 3:45
 "The Love Song" – 4:18
 "Hallelujah" – 4:17
 "Clap Ur Handz" – 1:20
 "Neutroniks" - 3:51
 "Dirty Water" (featuring Sam Roberts) – 4:14
 "One Blood (Jiggy Homicide)" – 3:29
 "Papercutz" (featuring Kamau) – 15:27
 "The Mirror" (Hidden track)

NOTE: "Neutroniks" is only featured on the Canadian version of the album. The song appears on all versions (except the Canadian edition) of his previous album Exit.

Singles
"Crabbuckit"
"B-Boy Stance"
"Man I Used to Be"
"The Love Song"
"Crucial"
"Dirty Water"

Charts

References

2004 albums
K-os albums
EMI Records albums
Virgin Records albums
Albums recorded at Hipposonic Studios
Albums recorded at Metalworks Studios
Albums recorded at The Warehouse Studio
Juno Award for Rap Recording of the Year recordings